Clarisa Fernández (born 28 August 1981) is a Argentine former professional tennis player.

She is best known for her semifinal appearance at the 2002 French Open, the first Argentine since Sabatini in 1992 to reach that stage. Fernández was ranked 87th in the world at the time of her shocking result. She defeated, in order, Lubomira Bacheva, Jelena Kostanić, Kim Clijsters, Elena Dementieva (No. 13), and Paola Suárez, before losing to second-seeded Venus Williams, in straight sets.

Fernández, a crafty left-handed player, turned professional in 1998. She did not have much success before her appearance at the French Open. She has six ITF titles to her name, including one in 2006. Since 2003, Fernández had been plagued with injuries. She suffered from tendinitis in her left shoulder, an injury to her left wrist, and to her right knee. Fernández enjoyed playing on hard and grass courts. She was coached by Leonardo Lerda. Her tennis inspirations were Pete Sampras and Martina Navratilova.

In April 2008, Fernández announced her retirement from professional tennis after a lengthy battle with knee injuries.

ITF finals

Singles: 10 (7–3)

Doubles: 10 (6–4)

Head-to-head records

Record against top-ten players
Fernández' match records against players who have been ranked in the top 10, with those who have been ranked No. 1 in boldface
 
  Kim Clijsters 1–0
  Elena Dementieva 1–0
  Petra Kvitová 1–0
  Mary Pierce 1–0
  Ai Sugiyama 1–0
  Paola Suárez 1–1
  Anastasia Myskina 1–3
  Flavia Pennetta 1–4
  Lindsay Davenport 0–1
  Daniela Hantuchová 0–1
  Justine Henin 0–1
  Martina Hingis 0–1
  Magdalena Maleeva 0–1
  Amélie Mauresmo 0–1
  Alicia Molik 0–1
  Nadia Petrova 0–1
  Venus Williams 0–1
  Barbara Schett 0–3

References

External links
 
 
 

1981 births
Living people
Argentine female tennis players
Argentine people of Spanish descent
Sportspeople from Córdoba, Argentina
Tennis players at the 1999 Pan American Games
Pan American Games bronze medalists for Argentina
Pan American Games medalists in tennis
Competitors at the 1998 South American Games
South American Games gold medalists for Argentina
South American Games bronze medalists for Argentina
South American Games medalists in tennis
Medalists at the 1999 Pan American Games
21st-century Argentine women